Israel participated in the Eurovision Song Contest 1982, which took place in Harrogate, United Kingdom on 24 April.

Their entry was Avi Toledano with the song "Hora" after he won the Israeli national final, Kdam Eurovision 1982. At Eurovision, the song came second, having received 100 points. He had previously participated in the Israeli selection process of last year with the song "Karnaval".

Before Eurovision

Kdam Eurovision 1982 
The Israel Broadcasting Authority (IBA) final to select their entry was held on 3 March 1982 in the Jerusalem Theater in Jerusalem, and was hosted by Daniel Pe'er. The votes of seven regional juries across Israel decided the winner. Each place had a jury who awarded 12, 10, 8, 7, 6, 5, 4, 3, 2, 1 point(s) for their top ten songs.

The winning entry was "Hora", performed by Avi Toledano and also composed by him, with lyrics written by Yoram Taharlev.

Spokespersons
Rishon LeZion - Dani Lewinstein
Tel-Aviv - Rafi Ginat
Kiryat Shmona - Haim Hecht
Haifa - Meir Einstein
Ashkelon - Moshe Timor
Jerusalem - Yarin Kimor
Ashdot Ya'akov - Benny Uri

At Eurovision
On the night of the final at the Harrogate International Centre, Avi Toledano performed 15th in the running order, following Yugoslavia and preceding Netherlands. At the close of voting, "Hora" had received 100 points, placing Israel in second out of a field of 18 competing countries 61 points behind Germany's winner Nicole. The Israeli jury awarded its 12 points to Germany. The Israeli spokesperson revealing the result of the Israeli vote in the final was Yitzhak Shim'oni.

Voting

References 

1982
Countries in the Eurovision Song Contest 1982
Eurovision